In animal anatomy, Henry's pocket, more formally known as a cutaneous marginal pouch, is a fold of skin forming an open pouch on the lower posterior part of the external ear. The pocket is situated in the approximate location of the antitragus in the human ear. It occurs in a number of species, including weasels and bats, but is particularly noticeable on the domestic cat, as well as some dog breeds.

The pocket is of unknown function, and it is unclear if it has any at all.  However, one hypothesis is that it aids in the detection of high-pitched sounds by attenuating lower pitches, especially when the ear is angled, common for a predator when hunting. Since the pocket occurs in a wide variety of mammalian species, it is likely a conserved feature from their common ancestor.

The pocket is a common area for parasites to gather, and should be checked during a veterinary examination.

References

Animal anatomy